The Brighton Half Marathon is an annual half marathon road running race.  The race is run primarily along Brighton seafront and passes through famous landmarks such as the Royal Pavilion, Brighton Pier, West Pier and Brighton Marina.

In 2014 the Brighton Half Marathon was named as one of eight events in the Vitality Run Series alongside the Liverpool Half Marathon, Reading Half Marathon, Oxford Half Marathon, Bath Half Marathon, North London Half Marathon, Hackney Half Marathon and British 10k London Run.

On 31 March 2017 it was announced that the course used for the 2015–2017 races was  short of the full distance and that the times of the runners in the three races are likely to be expunged from official records.
 This came after the organisers had previously apologised for the course being 0.32 miles too long in 2012.

Recent winners

Key:

See also

 List of half marathon races
 Brighton Marathon

References

External links

Half marathons in the United Kingdom
February sporting events
Recurring sporting events established in 1990
Sport in Brighton and Hove
Annual sporting events in the United Kingdom